Amphiphysin is a protein that in humans is encoded by the AMPH gene.

Function 

This gene encodes a protein associated with the cytoplasmic surface of synaptic vesicles. A subset of patients with stiff person syndrome who were also affected by breast cancer are positive for autoantibodies against this protein. Alternate splicing of this gene results in two transcript variants encoding different isoforms. Additional splice variants have been described, but their full length sequences have not been determined.

Amphiphysin is a brain-enriched protein with an N-terminal lipid interaction, dimerisation and membrane bending BAR domain, a middle clathrin and adaptor binding domain and a C-terminal SH3 domain. In the brain, its primary function is thought to be the recruitment of dynamin to sites of clathrin-mediated endocytosis. There are 2 mammalian amphiphysins with similar overall structure. A ubiquitous splice form of amphiphysin-2 (BIN1) that does not contain clathrin or adaptor interactions is highly expressed in muscle tissue and is involved in the formation and stabilization of the T-tubule network. In other tissues amphiphysin is likely involved in other membrane bending and curvature stabilization events.

Interactions 

Amphiphysin has been shown to interact with DNM1, Phospholipase D1, CDK5R1, PLD2, CABIN1 and SH3GL2.

See also 
 AP180
 Epsin

References

Further reading 

 
 
 
 
 
 
 
 
 
 
 
 
 
 
 
 
 
 
 
 
  Review.

External links 
 Bringing your curves to the bar, amphiphysin home page
 

Proteins